The 2022 National Women's League, also known as Deputy Mayor National Women's League  is the ongoing 2022 edition of the first-tier women's club football competition in Nepal organized by the All Nepal Football Association. The season was scheduled to start on 29 January 2022, but was postponed to March 2022.

Teams 
The season was made up of all teams that participated in the 2021 as well as two further regionally qualified teams.

Personnel and kits

Venues

League table

Results

Awards

Broadcast rights 
All matches are streamed live on Eleven Sports.

References

External links 

2022 in Nepalese football
Nepal